Topeka Correctional Facility is a Kansas Department of Corrections state prison for women located in Topeka, Kansas.  Built in the 1970s,  in 1995 it became the only women's prison in the state.  It administers a wide range of security levels, from maximum security through work-release. 

The site was founded in 1905 as the Topeka Industrial Institute by the African American educator Edward S. Stephens, as a school on its own farmland, more or less modeled on the Tuskegee Institute.  The school closed in 1955.

Conditions  
Conditions in the facility have long been identified as extremely problematic.  

A series of investigative articles in The Topeka Capital-Journal in September 2009 revealed a "complex black market" of contraband, bribes, and a sex trade, practices that culminated in a prison employee impregnating an inmate.  In January 2010 two independent audits, one by the National Institute of Corrections and another by a committee of the state legislature, recommended two dozen operational changes, and the facility's administrator was reassigned elsewhere.  

The result of a 2011–2012 investigation by the United States Department of Justice Civil Rights Division found that the problems persisted.  The Division's September 6, 2012 letter to Kansas Governor Sam Brownback concluded that "TCF fails to protect women prisoners from harm due to sexual abuse and misconduct from correctional staff and other prisoners in violation of their constitutional rights. TCF has a history of unabated officer-on-prisoner and prisoner-on-prisoner sexual abuse and misconduct."

Notable Inmates
Debora Green - Sentenced to 40 years to life for killing her two children.

References

External links
 Kansas Prison Inmate Database - Kansas Department of Corrections

Prisons in Kansas
Buildings and structures in Topeka, Kansas
Women's prisons in the United States
1970s establishments in Kansas